Burra was an electoral district of the House of Assembly in the Australian state of South Australia from 1875 to 1902, and again from 1938 to 1970.

After a boundary redistribution in 1902, it was replaced by Electoral district of Burra Burra. When it was recreated in 1938, the polling booths were: Aberdeen (later north Burra), Andrews, Belalie North, Black Springs, Booborowie, Bright, Canowie Belt, Emu Downs, Farrell's Flat, Hallett, Hanson, Jamestown, Kooringa, Leighton, Mannanarie, Mongolata Goldfields, Mount Bryan, Mount Bryan East, Spalding, Washpool, Willalo, World's End.

The town of Burra is currently located in the safe Liberal seat of Stuart.

Members

Election results

References 

Former electoral districts of South Australia
1875 establishments in Australia
1902 disestablishments in Australia
1938 establishments in Australia
1970 disestablishments in Australia
Constituencies established in 1938
Constituencies disestablished in 1970